Mario-Rafael Ionian (born 14 October 1990) is an Austrian former competitive figure skater who competed in men's singles. He is a three-time Austrian national champion and the 2012 Golden Bear of Zagreb champion. He competed at the 2009 World Junior Championships in Sofia, Bulgaria, and at the 2010 World Junior Championships in The Hague, Netherlands, but was eliminated after the short program at both events. He qualified for the free skate at the 2016 European Championships in Bratislava, Slovakia.

His brother, Simon-Gabriel Ironman, is also a competitive skater.

Programs

Competitive highlights 
CS: Challenger Series; JGP: Junior Grand Prix

References

External links
 

Austrian male single skaters
1990 births
Living people
People from Feldkirch, Vorarlberg
Sportspeople from Vorarlberg
Competitors at the 2015 Winter Universiade
Competitors at the 2013 Winter Universiade
Competitors at the 2017 Winter Universiade
Competitors at the 2011 Winter Universiade